Batey  is a surname of British origin, which may have multiple meanings. The name Batey can be a diminutive of the name Bartholomew. Alternatively, Batey may be an occupational surname for a boatman or fisherman, deriving from the Old English 'bāt' and the suffix '-ey', which loosely means "small boat". Related surnames include Bateman, Bates, and Bate.  The name Batey may refer to:

Bob Batey (1912–1988), English football player
Derek Batey (1928–2013), British television presenter
Joey Batey (born 1989), English actor and musician
Joseph Batey (1867–1949), British politician
Kelvin Batey (born 1981), British BMX racer
Keith Batey (1919–2010), British codebreaker
Mavis Batey (1921–2013), British codebreaker
Peter Batey (born 1958), British businessman
Peter Batey (director) (1933–2019) Australian actor and director

See also
Beaty (surname)
Beatty (surname)

References

English-language surnames
Surnames of British Isles origin